The 2017–18 Lega Basket Serie A, was the 96th season of the Lega Basket Serie A (LBA), known for sponsorship reasons as the Serie A PosteMobile, which is highest-tier level professional basketball league in Italy. The regular season started on October 1, 2017, and ended on May 9, 2018, with the playoffs started on May 12 (due to some Italian clubs, Reggio Emilia, Avellino and Venezia, are qualifying for the 2018 EuroCup Playoffs and the 2018 Champions League Playoffs) and finished on June 15, 2018.

As in previous years, Molten Corporation provided the official ball for all matches.

Umana Reyer Venezia were the defending champions. Venezia finished the regular season as top seeded team for the first time in its history.

EA7 Emporio Armani Milano won their 28th title by beating Dolomiti Energia Trento in game 6 of the finals.

Teams

Promotion and relegation (pre-season)

A total of 16 teams contested the league, including 15 sides from the 2016–17 season and one promoted from the 2016–17 Serie A2.

Segafredo Virtus Bologna was the promoted club from the Serie A2 Citroën after beating Alma Trieste at game 3 of league's playoffs, and returned in the highest-tier of the Italian basketball league system after just one season of absence.

Virtus Bologna replaced Vanoli Cremona who were relegated during the previous season.

In July 2017, Juvecaserta Basket was excluded by CONI from the 2017–18 LBA season, due to financial issues. Vanoli Cremona was reprieved and took the place of Juvecaserta.

Number of teams by region

Notes
 2016–17 LBA champion.
 2016–17 Serie A2 champion.

 Vanoli Cremona took the place of Pasta Reggia Caserta which was excluded from the 2017-18 LBA season.

Venues and locations

Personnel and sponsorship

Managerial changes

Changes from 2016–17
As in previous seasons, LBA clubs must play in arenas that seat at least 3,500 people. From 2017–18 season, all clubs must host their home playoffs matches in arenas with a seating capacity of at least 5,000 people.

In summer 2016, four Italian teams (Reggio Emilia, Trento, Sassari and Cantù) were forced to withdraw from EuroCup because of the FIBA and Euroleague Basketball controversy. From this season, Italian Basketball Federation will allow LBA clubs to rejoin EuroCup. There will be at least six teams in Europe. One in EuroLeague (Olimpia Milano directly enter the EuroLeague as licensed club), two in EuroCup (but they are negotiating with ECA for a third spot) and three in Basketball Champions League. Lega Basket decided Italian Clubs will be free to choose in which European Cup they want to play, based on final ranking and sports merit.

Rules
Each team is allowed either five or seven foreign players under two formulas:
5 foreigners from countries outside the European Union
3 foreigners from countries outside the EU, 4 foreigners from EU countries (also including those from countries signatory of the Cotonou Agreement)

Each club can choose the 5+5 formula, that consists of five Italian players and five foreign players, and the 3+4+5 formula, with five Italian players, three foreigners from countries outside the EU and four foreigners from EU countries or "Cotonou Countries".

At the end of the season there will be a prize of €500.000,00 for the top three ranked teams, that had chosen the 5+5 formula, considering the playing time of Italian players, and €200.000,00 for those teams that will obtain the best results with their youth sector.

Regular season
In the regular season, teams play against each other home-and-away in a round-robin format. The eight first qualified teams advanced to the Playoffs, the last seven qualified teams were eliminated, while the last one qualified team was relegated and replaced by the winner of the playoffs of the second-level Serie A2 Basket. The matchdays were from October 1, 2017 to May 9, 2018.

League table

Results

Positions by round
The table lists the positions of teams after completion of each round.

Updated to games played on 9 May 2018
Source: LBA

Final standings

Individual statistics
As of 9 May 2018.

Points

Assists

Steals

Rebounds

Blocks

Valuation

Awards

Finals MVP
 Andrew Goudelock (EA7 Emporio Armani Milano)

Most Valuable Player
 Jason Rich (Sidigas Avellino)

Best Player Under 22
 Diego Flaccadori (Dolomiti Energia Trento)

Best Coach
 Attilio Caja (Openjobmetis Varese)

Best Executive
 Federico Casarin (Umana Reyer Venezia)

Round MVP

Playoffs

The LBA playoffs quarterfinals and semifinals were best-of-five, while the finals series were best-of-seven. The playoffs started on May 12, 2018, and finished on June 15, 2018.

Serie A clubs in European competitions

Supercup

The 2017 Italian Supercup, also called Prozis Supercoppa 2017 for sponsorship reasons, was the 23rd edition of the super cup tournament of the Italian basketball. The Supercup opened the season on 23 and 24 September 2017, and it was contested in the Unieuro Arena in Forlì.

EA7 Emporio Armani Milano were the defending champions.

Qualified for the tournament were Banco di Sardegna Sassari, EA7 Emporio Armani Milano, Umana Reyer Venezia and Dolomiti Energia Trento.

EA7 Emporio Armani Milano lifted the Supercup trophy by downing Umana Reyer Venezia 82–77. Jordan Theodore led the winners with 29 points on 10-of-17 two-point shots. Andrew Goudelock and Amath M'Baye added 14 while Artūras Gudaitis had 12 and 8 rebounds for Milan. Not enough for Venezia the 14 points each for Michael Jenkins, Dominique Johnson and Michael Bramos and the 13 points of Hrvoje Perić. Coach Simone Pianigiani's guys controlled the game until the final buzzer and lift its second Supercup trophy. Jordan Theodore was named MVP of the competition.

Cup

The 50th edition of the Italian Cup, knows as the PosteMobile Final Eight for sponsorship reasons, was contested between 16 and 19 February 2017 in the Nelson Mandela Forum, Florence. Eight teams qualified for the Final Eight were Avellino, Brescia, Milano, Venezia, Torino, Cantù, Bologna and Cremona.

EA7 Emporio Armani Milano were the defending champions.

Fiat Torino made it to the Italian Cup final after edging Vanoli Cremona in overtime 87–92. Cremona's Simone Fontecchio drove for a layup with 16 seconds to go in the regulation to tie the game at 80-80, and Fiat failed to convert the final possession of the fourth quarter to win the game. But Diante Garrett scored a basket and Sasha Vujačić hit a triple midway through the extra session to give Fiat 83–88, the lead it never relinquished. Garrett finished with 18 points, Vander Blue scored 17, while Vujačić netted 15 points with 7 rebounds. Deron Washington amassed 13 points plus 13 rebounds in victory, while Fontecchio had 16 points in defeat. The second semifinal also went into overtime in which Germani Basket Brescia ousted Red October Cantù 82–87. Luca Vitali collected 19 points and 9 rebounds, while Marcus Landry had 17 points for the winners. Charles Thomas scored 20 points, and Jeremy Chappell amassed 17 points plus 13 rebounds for Cantù.

In the final game Sasha Vujačić’s layup in the dying seconds lifted Fiat Torino to a 69–67 victory over Germani Basket Brescia for the club's first Italian Cup. After a series of threes in the closing seconds left the game tied, Brescia had the ball for what appeared to be the final possession, however Marcus Landry and Luca Vitali each missed from downtown, Deron Washington picked up the loose ball and started a fast break that Vujacic finished with the winning layup. Diante Garrett paced Fiat with 16 points, Nobel Boungou Colo and Vander Blue added 11 points apiece and Washington scored 10 for the winners. Landry paced Brescia with 22 points and 9 rebounds and Michele Vitali added 14 points in defeat.

Vander Blue of Torino was named Finals MVP of the competition.

References

External links
 Lega Basket website 

Lega Basket Serie A seasons
Italian
2017–18 in Italian basketball